28 Squadron may refer to:

No. 28 Squadron PAF, Pakistan Air Force
No. 28 Squadron, Royal Air Force
No. 28 Squadron, Royal Australian Air Force
28 Squadron, South African Air Force